George Issac (1944–2013) was an Anglican bishop: he was the fifth Bishop of North Kerala. 

Issac was on 4 August 1944, at Fort Kochi, and educated at Leonard Theological Seminary in Jabalpur. He was ordained a deacon in 1968 and priest in 1969. He was appointed a chaplain at Christian Medical College Vellore . He then taught Chicago Theological Seminary until his episcopal appointment. 

He died at CMC Vellore, where he was undergoing treatment for cancer.

References

 Church of South India clergy
 Anglican bishops of North Kerala
21st-century Anglican bishops
1944 births
2013 deaths
People from Kochi
Chicago Theological Seminary faculty

20th-century Anglican bishops